1,3-Dichloro-1,1,2,2,3-pentafluoropropane (HCFC-225cb, chemical formula ) is a hydrochlorofluorocarbon. It is a derivative of propane. It has been used as a replacement for 1,1,2-trichloro-1,2,2-trifluoroethane in cleaning agents.

Atmospheric effects 
The production of 1,3-dichloro-1,1,2,2,3-pentafluoropropane  and use as a cleaning agent replacement for CFC-113 may result in its release to the environment through various waste streams. If released to air, a vapor pressure of 286 mm Hg at 25 °C indicates 1,3-dichloro-1,1,2,2,3-pentafluoropropane will exist solely as a vapor in the ambient atmosphere. When released in air, it is subject to degradation in the atmosphere by reaction with photochemically produced hydroxyl radicals; the half-life for this reaction in air is estimated to be 4.9 years.

Manufacturing 
1,3-Dichloro-1,1,2,2,3-pentafluoropropane is manufactured in industry by the addition of Dichlorofluoromethane to Tetrafluoroethylene. In 2016, production in the United States accounted to 11,339 Kilograms. In most cases, it is fairly unreactive. However, in some circumstances, it can react with active metals under extreme temperatures. When reacted with strong bases, toxic gases can be released.

See also 

 F-Gases

References 

Hydrochlorofluorocarbons